Def Squad Presents Erick Onasis is the third solo studio album by American rapper and producer Erick Sermon. It was released on June 27, 2000 via DreamWorks Records. The album peaked at #53 on the U.S. Billboard 200 and reached the fifteenth spot on the Top R&B/Hip-Hop Albums chart.

The album is notable for the recording debut of rapper Rick Ross who went by his original name Teflon Da Don.

Album title significance
In regards to the album's title, it was also an alias that Sermon briefly adopted at the time for this particular album. In regards to the meaning, he stated:
"The name is something I came up with when I was watching the [coverage of the] death of JFK Jr. They [were] talking about him and his family and his mom came up, and then Aristotle came up. Then I read something on him, about four or five pages. And it was interesting to me, about how he was, how spiritual he was, how he was just coming up in the game until he mastered his field and became who he became. So I took that name".

Another reason for the album's title was due to contractual issues stemming from Sermon's previous label Def Jam Recordings. Because of the issue, Def Squad Presents Erick Onasis was promoted as a compilation album, despite Sermon's appearance and production on most of the songs.

Track listing

Chart history

References

External links
Def Squad Presents: Erick Onasis on Bandcamp

2000 albums
Erick Sermon albums
DreamWorks Records albums
Albums produced by DJ Quik
Albums produced by DJ Scratch
Albums produced by Erick Sermon